Diones Coelho da Costa (born 21 June 1985), known as Diones, is a Brazilian footballer who plays as midfielder for Associação Desportiva Bahia de Feira.

Career statistics

References

External links
 

1985 births
Living people
Brazilian footballers
Association football midfielders
Campeonato Brasileiro Série A players
Campeonato Brasileiro Série B players
Campeonato Brasileiro Série C players
Campeonato Brasileiro Série D players
Maranhão Atlético Clube players
Clube de Regatas Brasil players
Ferroviário Atlético Clube (CE) players
Associação Desportiva Bahia de Feira players
Sampaio Corrêa Futebol Clube players
Esporte Clube Bahia players
Associação Chapecoense de Futebol players
Joinville Esporte Clube players
Ceará Sporting Club players
Boa Esporte Clube players
Botafogo Futebol Clube (SP) players
Esporte Clube Juventude players
Parauapebas Futebol Clube players